Madan is a village (село) in Northwestern Bulgaria, located in Boychinovtsi Municipality (община Бойчиновци) of Montana Province (Област Монтана).

References

Villages in Montana Province